Ticorea is a genus of flowering plants belonging to the family Rutaceae.

Its native range is Southern America.

Species:
 Ticorea diandra Kallunki 
 Ticorea foetida Aubl.

References

Zanthoxyloideae
Zanthoxyloideae genera